Caneland Central is a regional shopping centre located adjacent to the Pioneer River in Mackay, Queensland, Australia. The centre has stores including a Myer department store, Coles and Woolworths supermarkets, Big W and Target discount department stores, Best & Less and Pillowtalk stores as well as the electronic store JB Hi-Fi. The centre is home to over 230 specialty stores, of which the majority are related to fashion. Caneland houses two foodcourts, including one overlooking the Pioneer River.

History

2010 Development 
A major A$210 million redevelopment and expansion of Caneland Central was announced in April 2010. The project was projected to create about 1000 jobs and give Mackay's economy a significant boost. The redevelopment included construction of the region's first Myer, outdoor dining, additional speciality and larger stores, extra parking and an expanded food court. The expansion project was undertaken to employ best-practice environmentally sustainable design features. The centre's owner Bovis Lend Lease was responsible for project management, design and construction. The project was officially opened in October 2011.

References 

Buildings and structures in Mackay, Queensland
Shopping centres in Queensland
Shopping malls established in 1974